

559001–559100 

|-bgcolor=#f2f2f2
| colspan=4 align=center | 
|}

559101–559200 

|-bgcolor=#f2f2f2
| colspan=4 align=center | 
|}

559201–559300 

|-bgcolor=#f2f2f2
| colspan=4 align=center | 
|}

559301–559400 

|-bgcolor=#f2f2f2
| colspan=4 align=center | 
|}

559401–559500 

|-bgcolor=#f2f2f2
| colspan=4 align=center | 
|}

559501–559600 

|-id=521
| 559521 Sonbird ||  || Sonbird is an indie-rock music band from Żywiec in Poland. || 
|}

559601–559700 

|-bgcolor=#f2f2f2
| colspan=4 align=center | 
|}

559701–559800 

|-bgcolor=#f2f2f2
| colspan=4 align=center | 
|}

559801–559900 

|-bgcolor=#f2f2f2
| colspan=4 align=center | 
|}

559901–560000 

|-bgcolor=#f2f2f2
| colspan=4 align=center | 
|}

References 

559001-560000